Binge Records is a Brooklyn, NY based indie rock record label that was founded by Dennis Tyhacz and Luke McCartney in January 2004.  "Signs of Life" by Nemo was the label's first release.  Other releases on Binge Records include "The Calling" by The Sound Mirrors in 2007, and "Burn Away" (EP) by The Good Bad Guys in March 2009.

See also
 Review of Signs of Life
 Interview with Dennis Tyhacz & Luke McCartney
 Binge Records website
 List of record labels

American record labels
Record labels established in 2004
Indie rock record labels